Norman Minnaar (23 April 1957 – 15 March 2015) was a South African cricketer. He played twenty-two first-class matches for Border between 1982 and 1987.

References

External links
 

1957 births
2015 deaths
South African cricketers
Border cricketers
Cricketers from East London, Eastern Cape